Jorge Andrew (born 2 November 1951) is a former professional tennis player from Venezuela. Most of his tennis success was in doubles. During his career, he finished runner-up at three doubles events. Andrew was a member of the Venezuelan Davis Cup team from 1967 to 1984, posting a 6–25 record in singles and a 7–10 record in doubles.

Career finals

Doubles (3 losses)

External links

1951 births
Living people
Tennis players from Caracas
Venezuelan male tennis players
20th-century Venezuelan people
21st-century Venezuelan people